Dane Clark (born Bernard Zanville; February 26, 1912September 11, 1998) was an American character actor who was known for playing, as he labeled himself, "Joe Average."

Early life
Clark was born in Brooklyn, New York City, the son of Jewish immigrants – Samuel, a sporting goods store owner, and his wife Rose.

His date of birth is a matter of some dispute among different sources.

He graduated from Cornell University in 1936 and earned a law degree in 1938 at St. John's University School of Law in Queens, New York. During the Great Depression, he worked as a professional boxer, minor league baseball player, construction worker, and model.

Acting career
Modeling brought him in contact with people in the arts. He gradually perceived them to be snobbish, with their talk of the "theatah," and "I decided to give it a try myself, just to show them anyone could do it."

Theatre
 
Clark's early acting experience included work with the Group Theatre in New York City. He progressed from small Broadway parts to larger ones, eventually taking over the role of George from Wallace Ford in the 1937 production of Of Mice and Men. His other Broadway credits include Mike Downstairs (1968), A Thousand Clowns (1962), Fragile Fox (1954), The Number (1951), Dead End (1935), Waiting for Lefty (1935), Till the Day I Die (1935), and Panic (1935).

Film 
Clark's first film was The Pride of the Yankees (1942). He had an uncredited bit in The Glass Key (1942) at Paramount.

Warner Bros.
Clark got his big break when he was signed by Warner Bros. in 1943. He worked alongside some of his era's biggest stars, often in war movies such as Action in the North Atlantic (1943), his breakthrough part, opposite Humphrey Bogart. According to Clark, Bogart gave him his stage name. Hollywood newspaper columnist Louella Parsons wrote in 1942 that Warner Bros. first changed his name to Zane Clark but then decided on Dane Clark because "Too many confused Zane Clark with Jane Clark."

He was third billed in Destination Tokyo (1943) beneath Cary Grant and John Garfield, and in The Very Thought of You (1944) with Dennis Morgan and Eleanor Parker. He had one of the leads in Hollywood Canteen (1944), playing an actual role while most Warners stars made cameo appearances as themselves. Clark had the lead in the 1944 short film I Won't Play with Janis Paige, which received the 1945 Academy Award for Best Short Subject (Two-Reel). Clark supported Morgan in God Is My Co-Pilot (1945) and Garfield in Pride of the Marines (1945).

Exhibitors voted Clark the 16th most popular star at the US box office in 1945.

Leading man
Clark supported Bette Davis and Glenn Ford in A Stolen Life (1946) and was promoted to top billing for Her Kind of Man (1946), a crime film. He followed it with That Way with Women (1947), Deep Valley (1947), and Embraceable You (1948). Republic Pictures borrowed him to play the lead for Frank Borzage in Moonrise (1948). At Warner Bros., he was in Whiplash (1948). Clark went to United Artists for Without Honor (1948), then back to Warner Bros. for Backfire (1950) and Barricade (1950). He travelled to England to make Highly Dangerous (1950) and France for Gunman in the Streets (1951). Back at Columbia he was in Never Trust a Gambler (1951). He acted in the United Artists Western Fort Defiance (1951). He returned to Britain for The Gambler and the Lady (1953), Murder by Proxy (1954) and Five Days (1955), all for Hammer Films. In the US, he was in Go Man Go (1954) with the Harlem Globetrotters and Toughest Man Alive (1955).

During the 1950s, he became one of a small group of actors (excluding the original 'founding' members brought in at the Studio's inception) awarded life membership in the Actors Studio.

Radio, television and later films

Clark played Peter Chambers in the short-lived radio program Crime and Peter Chambers, a half-hour show which aired from April 6 to September 7, 1954.

Clark first appeared on television in the late 1940s, and after the mid-1950s worked much more in that medium than in feature films. In the 1954/1955 season, he co-starred as the character Richard Adams in the crime drama Justice.

On July 1, 1955 while starring in the play The Shrike, the lead actress Isabel Bonner, suffered a brain hemorrhage and died.  The scene took place in a hospital, and when Isabel Bonner collapsed on a bed, Dane Clark, ad-libbing, put his arm around Bonner and said, "Ann, speak to me. Is something the matter? What's wrong, darling? I love you." Then, realizing something was wrong, he turned to the wings and said "Bring down the curtain." A film editor in the audience, Harold Cornsweet, later said of the ad-libbed scene: "It was so realistic that people in the audience were crying." 

He returned to films for The Man Is Armed (1956) and Outlaw's Son (1957). 

In 1958 he was a guest star on the television series Wagon Train in The John Wilbut Story. Clark played John Wilbut, a man who some on the train believe to be John Wilkes Booth on the run from the assassination of Lincoln. 

In 1959, he reprised Humphrey Bogart's role as Slate in Bold Venture, a short-lived television series. He also guest starred on a number of television shows, including Faye Emerson's Wonderful Town, Appointment with Adventure, CBS's Rawhide in the episode "Incident of the Night Visitor", and The Twilight Zone, in the episode "The Prime Mover".

In 1970, he guest-starred in an episode of The Silent Force and had a role in The McMasters (1970). That same year he appeared as Barton Ellis on The Men From Shiloh, rebranded name of the long running TV Western series The Virginian in the episode titled "The Mysterious Mrs. Tate." He also played Lieutenant Tragg in the short-lived revival of the Perry Mason television series in 1973, and appeared in the 1976 miniseries Once an Eagle.

Death
Clark died on September 11, 1998, of lung cancer at St. John's Hospital in Santa Monica, California. His remains were cremated and his ashes given to his widow.

Complete filmography

Toils of the Law (1938 short) (as Bernard Zanville)
Money and the Woman (1940) – (scenes deleted)
Sunday Punch (1942) – Phil Grogan (uncredited)
The Pride of the Yankees (1942) – Fraternity Boy (uncredited)
Wake Island (1942) – 'Sparks' (radioman #1) (uncredited)
The Glass Key (1942) – Henry Sloss (uncredited)
Tennessee Johnson (1942) – Wirts (uncredited)
The Rear Gunner (1943 short) – Benny (as Bernard Zanville)
Action in the North Atlantic (1943) – Johnnie Pulaski
Destination Tokyo (1943) – Tin Can
Over the Wall (1943 short) – Benny Vigo
The Very Thought of You (1944) – Sgt. 'Fixit' Gilman
I Won't Play (1944 short) – Joe Fingers
Hollywood Canteen (1944) – Sgt. Nowland
God Is My Co-Pilot (1945) – Johnny Petach
Pride of the Marines (1945) – Lee Diamond
A Stolen Life (1946) – Karnock
Her Kind of Man (1946) – Don Corwin
That Way with Women (1947) – Greg Wilson
Deep Valley (1947) – Barry Burnette
Embraceable You (1948) – Eddie Novoc
Moonrise (1948) – Danny Hawkins
Whiplash (1948) – Michael Gordon – aka Mike Angelo
Without Honor (1949) – Bill Bandle
Backfire (1950) – Ben Arno / Lou Walsh
Barricade (1950) – Bob Peters
Le traqué (1950) – Eddy Roback
Highly Dangerous (1950) – Bill Casey
Gunman in the Streets (1950) – Eddy Roback
Never Trust a Gambler (1951) – Steve Garry
Fort Defiance (1951) – Johnny Tallon
The Gambler and the Lady (1952) – Jim Forster
Go, Man, Go! (1954) – Abe Saperstein
Murder by Proxy (aka Blackout) (1954) – Casey Morrow
Five Days (aka Paid to Kill) (1954) – James Nevill
Thunder Pass (1954) – Captain Dave Storm
Port of Hell (1954) – Gibson 'Gibb' Pardee
Toughest Man Alive (1955) – Lee Stevens, posing as Pete Gore
Massacre (1956) – Capitán Ramón
The Man Is Armed (1956) – Johnny Morrison
Outlaw's Son (1957) – Nate Blaine
The Closing Door (1960 TV movie)
Dage i min fars hus (aka Days in My Father's House) (1968) – Eddie
The McMasters (1970) – Spencer
The Face of Fear (1971 TV movie) – Tamworth
The Family Rico (1972 TV movie) – Boston Phil
Say Goodbye, Maggie Cole (1972 TV movie) – Hank Cooper
Cop on the Beat (1975 TV movie) – Lt. Baker
Murder on Flight 502 (1975 TV movie) – Ray Garwood
James Dean (1976 TV movie) – James Whitmore
The Woman Inside (1981)
Blood Song (1982) – Sheriff Gibbons
Last Rites (1988) – Don Carlo

Partial television credits
For TV movies, see the section above.
The Twilight Zone (1961, episode "The Prime Mover") – Ace Larsen
Dan August (1971, episode "The Meal Ticket") - Sam
Hawaii Five-O (1975, episode "The Hostage") – Jesse
Hawaii Five-O (1977, episode "Blood Money Is Hard to Wash") – Victor Jovanko
Hawaii Five-O (1978, episode "The Pagoda Factor") – Sergeant Riley
''Murder She Wrote (1989, episode "The Grand Old Lady") - Mr. Viscard

Radio appearances

References

External links

1912 births
1998 deaths
20th-century American male actors
American male film actors
American male stage actors
American male television actors
Cornell University alumni
Jewish American male actors
Male actors from New York City
People from Flatbush, Brooklyn
St. John's University School of Law alumni
Warner Bros. contract players
20th-century American Jews